The Castiglioni Brothers (Italian: I fratelli Castiglioni) is a 1937 Italian "white-telephones" comedy film directed by Corrado D'Errico and starring Camillo Pilotto, Ugo Ceseri and Amedeo Nazzari. It was based on a play of the same title by Alberto Colantuoni. The film's sets were designed by the art director Guido Fiorini.

Nazzari, who would go on to be the leading star of Italian cinema over the next two decades, was previously given a screen test by D'Errico who was dismissive of his talents.

Cast
 Camillo Pilotto as Mario Castiglioni 
 Ugo Ceseri as Ismaele Castiglioni 
 Amedeo Nazzari as Fulvio Castiglioni 
 Armando Migliari as Armando Castiglioni 
 Luisa Ferida as Ninetta 
 Olga Capri as Eusebia 
 Silvio Bagolini as Valerio 
 Vanna Vanni as Gisa 
 Checco Durante as L'oste 
 Enrico Viarisio as Avvocato De Ambrosio 
 Raffaello Niccoli as Il notaio Giudi 
 Claudio Ermelli as L'usciere 
 Dina Perbellini as Berta

References

Bibliography 
Gundle, Stephen. Mussolini's Dream Factory: Film Stardom in Fascist Italy. Berghahn Books, 2013.

External links 

1937 films
Italian comedy films
Italian black-and-white films
1937 comedy films
1930s Italian-language films
Films directed by Corrado D'Errico
Italian films based on plays
1930s Italian films